The Buckhorn Wilderness is a  mountainous wilderness area on the northeastern Olympic Peninsula in Washington, USA. Named after Buckhorn Mountain, the wilderness abuts the eastern boundary of Olympic National Park which includes nearby Mount Constance, Inner Constance, Warrior Peak, and Mount Deception.

History
In 1984, the U.S. Congress established five wilderness areas within the Olympic National Forest:
 Buckhorn Wilderness
 Colonel Bob Wilderness
 Mount Skokomish Wilderness
 The Brothers Wilderness
 Wonder Mountain Wilderness

Buckhorn Wilderness is the largest of the five, all of which sit on the eastern flank of the Olympic Wilderness within Olympic National Park. Buckhorn Wilderness is administered by the Hood Canal Ranger District of the Olympic National Forest.

Geography 
A notable historical site in the Buckhorn Wilderness is the Tubal Cain mine.

Ecology 
The wilderness lies within the rain shadow of the Olympic Range, resulting in a relatively drier climate. Despite this, the lowland forests (below about 4,000 feet) are still dominated by stands of old-growth western red cedar, western hemlock, and Douglas fir, in addition to numerous understory organisms such as devil's club, salal, thimbleberry, fungi, and mosses. Some slopes, such as the south side of Buckhorn Mountain, are rather arid above tree line due to fast-draining soils, sunny exposure, and low precipitation in the summer months.

Recreation

See also
 List of U.S. Wilderness Areas
 List of old growth forests

References

External links
Buckhorn Wilderness U.S. Forest Service 
Buckhorn Wilderness Wilderness.net (The University of Montana)

Protected areas of Clallam County, Washington
Protected areas of Jefferson County, Washington
Wilderness areas of Washington (state)
Olympic Mountains
Olympic National Forest
Protected areas established in 1984
1984 establishments in Washington (state)